Jan Blažej Santini Aichel  (3 February 1677 – 7 December 1723) was a Czech architect of Italian descent, whose major works represent the unique Baroque Gothic style - the special combination of the Baroque and Gothic styles.

Biography
He was born on the day of Saint Blaise as the oldest son to a respectable family of a Prague stonemasons Santini Aichel (his grandfather Antonio Aichel moved from Italy to Prague in the 1630s) and was baptized in the St. Vitus Cathedral as Johann Blasius Aichel. He was born with a physical disability – paralysis of a half of his body. This prevented him from a successful follow-up to his father's career. He only served his time of apprenticeship (as did his brother Franz), but he also studied painting from the imperial and royal painter Christian  Schröder.

Around 1696 he started to travel and gain experience. After his journey through Austria he arrived in Rome, Italy, where he had the possibility to meet with the work of a radical architect, Francesco Borromini. Borromini's influence is apparent in his predilection for star-shaped forms and complex symbolism. Many of his buildings are airy and elegant, yet he was considered a maverick genius by his contemporaries and exerted little influence on subsequent generations of Bohemian architects. It was in Italy where Santini incorporated into his name his father's name, Santini.

In 1700 Santini started to design independently and to build, which ensured his own income, he then became a member of one craft guild and founded his own construction company.

Santini married Schröder's daughter (Veronica Elisabeth) in 1707. They had four children, but all three sons died from tuberculosis at an early age; the only child left was Anna Veronika (born 1713). Santini's wife died seven years later and he remarried a South Bohemian noblewoman, Antonia Ignatia Chrapická of Mohliškovice whereby Santini was ennobled. Daughter Jana Ludmila and son Jan Ignác Rochus were born from this marriage.

Santini acquired the style of Jean Baptiste Mathey and after his death also finished several works of him. In 1705, he bought Valkounský house (no. 211) in Nerudova street for 3000 gold coins in cash and rebuilt it. Santini became a well-known person, but unfortunately, he died at a fairly young age of 46 and some of his works therefore remained unfinished.

The asteroid 37699 Santini-Aichl is named in his honour.

Works
 Monastery Church of the Assumption of Our Lady and Saint John the Baptist in Sedlec u Kutné Hory (reconstruction, 1703–1708, World Heritage Site)
 Chapel of Saint Anne in Panenské Břežany (1705–1707)
 Pilgrimage Church of the Annunciation of the Virgin Mary and Cistercian Provost Office in Mariánská Týnice (1707–1710)
 Convent of the Cistercian Monastery in Plasy (reconstruction, 1711–1723)
 Monastery Church of the Assumption of Virgin Mary, St Wolfgang and St Benedict in Kladruby (1711)
 Monastery Church of the Nativity of Virgin Mary in Želiv (reconstruction, 1714–1720)
 Pilgrimage Church of the Name of Virgin Mary in Křtiny (1718)
 Pilgrimage Church of Saint John of Nepomuk on Zelená hora in Žďár nad Sázavou (1719–1727, World Heritage Site)
 Karlova Koruna Chateau in Chlumec nad Cidlinou (1721–1723)
 Church of Saint Wenceslaus in Zvole (reconstruction)
 Church of Saints Peter and Paul in Horní Bobrová (1714)
 Church of the Visitation of Virgin Mary in Obyčtov
 Church of the Assumption of Virgin Mary in Netín
 Provost Church of St Peter and Paul in Rajhrad (1721)
 Initial architect for the rebuilding of Zbraslav chateau
 Design and constructions of the Kalec chateau
 Reconstruction of Valkounsky House (No.211-III) in Prague - Malá Strana (after 1705)

Gallery

References

2. HORYNA, Mojmír J. B. Santini-Aichel – Život a dílo. Karolinum, Praha 1998, .

3. KALINA, Pavel. In opere gotico unicus: The Hybrid Architecture of Jan Blazej Santini-Aichel and Patterns of Memory in Post-Reformation Bohemia.Praha: UMENI-ART 58.1 (2010): 42-+.

4. YOUNG, Michael. Santini-Aichel'S Design for the Baroque Convent at the Cistercian. New York: Columbia, 1994.

External links 

 

1677 births
1723 deaths
Architects from Prague
Czech Baroque architects
Czech people of Italian descent